Touch is the third studio album by British pop duo Eurythmics, released on 14 November 1983 by RCA Records. It became the duo's first number-one album on the UK Albums Chart, and also peaked at number seven on the US Billboard 200. It has since been certified Platinum in both the United Kingdom and the United States. The album spawned the singles "Who's That Girl?", "Right by Your Side" and "Here Comes the Rain Again", all of which reached the top 10 of the UK Singles Chart.

The album was listed 500th on Rolling Stones "The 500 Greatest Albums of All Time" in 2003, and again on a revised list in 2012, at number 492.

Background
By the time Touch was released, Eurythmics had achieved international success with their single "Sweet Dreams (Are Made of This)" and the album of the same name. Preceded by the single "Who's That Girl?", Touch was recorded and mixed in about three weeks at Eurythmics' own London studio facility, The Church.

An accompanying remix album, Touch Dance, was released in May 1984.

2005 reissue
On 14 November 2005, Sony BMG repackaged and re-released Eurythmics' back catalogue as "2005 Deluxe Edition Reissues". Each of their eight studio albums' original track listings were supplemented with bonus tracks and remixes.

Critical reception

Accolades
In 2000, Touch was voted number 221 in Colin Larkin's All Time Top 1000 Albums. In 2012, Rolling Stone ranked Touch at number 492 on its list of "The 500 Greatest Albums of All Time", calling the album "divine synth pop". It had originally appeared at number 500 on the 2003 version of the list. Slant Magazine placed the album at number 47 on its list of "The 100 Best Albums of the 1980s".

Track listing

Personnel
Credits adapted from the liner notes of Touch.

Eurythmics
 Annie Lennox – lead vocals, backing vocals, keyboards, flute, arrangements
 David A. Stewart – guitars, keyboards, dulcimer, xylophone, backing vocals, drum sequencer, synthesiser sequencer, arrangements

Additional musicians
 Dick Cuthell – trumpet, flugelhorn, cornet
 Dean Garcia – bass guitar
 Michael Kamen – string arrangements, string conducting
 British Philharmonic Orchestra – strings
 Martin Dobson – baritone saxophone on "Right by Your Side"

Technical
 David A. Stewart – production
 Jon Bavin – engineering

Artwork
 Peter Ashworth – outer sleeve photography
 Brian Aris – inner sleeve photography
 Laurence Stevens – art direction, design

Charts

Weekly charts

Year-end charts

Certifications

References

Bibliography

 

1983 albums
Albums produced by David A. Stewart
Eurythmics albums
RCA Records albums
Albums recorded at The Church Studios